Heart, Mind and Soul may refer to:

 Heart, Mind and Soul (El DeBarge album), 1994
 Heart, Mind and Soul (TVXQ album), 2006
 Christian anthropology, a discussion of the components of humans